The Birmingham Giants were a Negro league baseball team, based in Birmingham, Alabama, from 1904 through 1909.  They were the first black professional baseball team in the city.

C. I. Taylor managed and played for the Giants. His brothers Candy Jim Taylor and Steel Arm Johnny Taylor also played for the team.

References

Negro league baseball teams
Sports teams in Birmingham, Alabama
Defunct baseball teams in Alabama
Baseball teams disestablished in 1909
Baseball teams established in 1904